Vaishakada Dinagalu (Kannada: ವೈಶಾಖದ ದಿನಗಳು) is a 1993 Indian Kannada film, directed by Katte Ramachandra and produced by Mohan Bhasagoda. The film stars Vishnuvardhan, Moon Moon Sen, Harshavardhan and Vanitha Vasu in lead roles. The film had musical score by Indu Vishwanath.

Cast

Vishnuvardhan as Vishnu
Moon Moon Sen as Rajani
Harshavardhan as Vishwa
Vanitha Vasu as Vanitha
Anjali Sudhakar
Thoogudeepa Srinivas as Inspector 
Avinash as Avinash
Praveen Nayak
Dr Sridhar 
Vilas Malai
Ramadas
Manju
Ganesh Prasad
Kishore Goankar
Sathyananda
Dhanpath
Ravi Ganjagatti
Kumari Pallavi Rao
Master Deepak

References

External links
 
 

1990s Kannada-language films